Protestants are the 4th largest religious group in Serbia, after Eastern Orthodox Christians, Roman Catholics and Muslims. In the 2011 census, there were 71,284 Protestants in Serbia (excluding the territory of Kosovo) and they comprised 1% of the population of the country. Ethnic Slovaks constitute majority of Serbia's Protestant community. Some members of other ethnic groups (especially Serbs in absolute terms and Hungarians and Germans in proportional terms) are also adherents of various forms of Protestant Christianity.

Most of the Protestants (64,029) are located in the province of Vojvodina. The largest percentage on municipal level is in the municipalities of Bački Petrovac and Kovačica, where the absolute or relative majority of the population are ethnic Slovaks (most of whom are adherents of Protestant Christianity). Other relatively large Protestant community is found in the second largest Serbian city Novi Sad with 8,499 Protestants. Outside Vojvodina, sizable concentration of Protestants in the rest of the country are recorded in Leskovac (2,493) and Belgrade (1,606).

There are various Protestant groups in the country, including Methodists, Seventh-day Adventists and Evangelical Baptists (Nazarene). Many of these groups are situated in the culturally diverse province of Vojvodina. Prior to the end of World War II, the number of Protestants in the region was larger.

Protestantism (mostly in its Nazarene form) started to spread among Serbs in Vojvodina in the last decades of the 19th century. Although the percentage of Protestants among Serbs is not large, it is the only religious form besides Orthodoxy which is currently widespread among Serbs.

Denominations

Christian Nazarene Community

The Nazarene form of Protestant Christianity, known as Apostolic Christian Church (Nazarene) in North America, appeared among Serbs during the 1860s in the region of Vojvodina, which in that time was administered by the Austrian Empire (renamed to Austria-Hungary in 1867). The religious group also spread to what was then the Principality of Serbia as early as in 1872.

Due to their commitment to non-violence and refusal to carry weapons and serve in the army, the Nazarenes were persecuted and imprisoned by all three state authorities under which they lived: the pre-World War I Austro-Hungarian and Serbian and post-World War I Serb-Croat-Slovene (i.e. Yugoslav). In 1892, most of 210 prisoners in Pest who were imprisoned because they refused to carry weapons were Serbs from Bačka.

During the last two decades of the 19th century, a sizable Nazarene communities were formed in several (mostly ethnic Serb) settlements in Vojvodina: Melenci, Dolovo, Mokrin, Lokve, Mramorak, Padina, Debeljača, Bavanište, Banatski Karlovac, Perlez, and Banatsko Novo Selo. Larger Nazarene communities were also present in some sizable cities of the region, such are Sombor, Novi Sad, Pančevo, and Veliki Bečkerek. The settlement with largest percentage of Nazarenes among population was the Serb village of Nadalj (in the end of the 19th century, 250 of total number of 2,000 villagers were Nazarenes).

According to 1891 census, there was 6,829 Nazarenes in the Kingdom of Hungary (one of two parts of Austria-Hungary), of which 4,400 were Serbs (the presented numbers did not included territory of autonomous Kingdom of Croatia-Slavonia). According to an unofficial estimation from 1897, there were 9,000–10,000 Nazarene Serbs in the Kingdom of Hungary and 1,000 more in the Kingdom of Serbia and Bosnia.

According to 1925 police report, there were 16,652 adult Nazarenes in 352 settlements in Bačka, Banat, Syrmia and Baranja. The largest number of them were Serbs (7,971), while others were Slovaks (3,336), Hungarians (2,144), Romanians (1,537), Germans (986), Croats (669), Bulgarians (44), and Czechs (4). According to 1953 census, there were 15,650 Nazarenes in Yugoslavia.

In 1924, Serb-Croat-Slovene authorities arrested more than 2,000 Nazarenes who refused to carry weapons. Between 1927 and 1933, there was 80% Serbs among Nazarenes who were imprisoned in Yugoslav prisons, while during the 1960s about 65% of imprisoned Nazarenes were Serbs.

According to unofficial research that was conducted during the 1980s, there were 15,000 Nazarenes in Vojvodina who lived in 170 communities and 96% of them were Serbs.

Although the end of the 19th and beginning of the 20th century were periods in which Nazarene religious group was widely spread among Serbs, later parts of the 20th century recorded certain decline of the Nazarene community. The decline of the community had various reason: many members of the community emigrated across the ocean and settled in the United States and Canada, some of the Nazarenes who originally were of Eastern Orthodox background converted back to Eastern Orthodox Christianity, while others converted to other Protestant denominations. Since World War I, the largest Protestant community among Serbs became the Adventists.

In 2002, 1,426 citizens of Serbia declared themselves in census as a members of Nazarene community. Seat of the Nazarene community in Serbia is in Novi Sad.

Christian Adventist Church

Christian Adventist Church in Serbia is part of the Union of the Christian Adventist Church of Southeastern Europe. The Union is divided into 3 provinces and one mission; the seats of the provinces are in Novi Sad, Niš and Sarajevo. There are about 7,000 active Adventist adherents and 175 Adventist churches in Serbia.

First Adventist missionaries in the territory of present-day Serbia started their work in Vojvodina in 1890. In 1893, a society for translation, printing and popularization of Adventist literature was formed. The literature was printed in Hungarian and Serbian language. First Adventist who preached in Serbian language (in 1901) was Petar Todor. He gathered the group of adherents in the village of Kumane in Banat in 1905. Subsequently, the Adventist communities were formed in Titel, Novo Miloševo and Mokrin (in 1906), Kikinda (in 1907), Belgrade and Novi Kneževac (in 1909), Zemun (in 1910), etc. Northern Adventist province centered in Novi Sad was established in 1911, while southern province centered in Niš was established in 1931.

The Christian Adventist Church also founded a mailing Bible school, which during the existence of the Socialist Federal Republic of Yugoslavia had about 4,000 students in Serbo-Croatian (3,000 in Cyrillic and 1,000 in Latin script), and about 500–1,000 students in Hungarian, Slovene and Macedonian per year.

Seventh Day Adventist Reform Movement Union
Seventh Day Adventist Reform Movement Union is present in Serbia since 1918. There is organizational unit of this community in Vračar, Belgrade.

Christian Baptist Church

There are two groups of Christian Baptist communities in Serbia: the Alliance of Christian Baptist Churches in Serbia which has its seat in Belgrade, 69 churches and 1,983 adherents; and the Union of Evangelical Christians-Baptists of Serbia and Montenegro which has its seat in Vrnjačka Banja, 17 churches and 700 adherents. According to other source, there were in Serbia (as of 2002) 1,572 members of Christian Baptist Church and 109 members of Independent Baptist Church.

Protestant Christian Community
The Protestant Christian Community have its seat in Novi Sad. It was founded in 1991. Since 2008, the Protestant Christian Community have jurisdiction over Protestant Theological Seminary in Novi Sad, which was previously under jurisdiction of the Baptist Union of Serbia.

Evangelical Methodist Church

The Evangelical Methodist Church in Serbia has its seat in Novi Sad. It is present in Serbia since 1898. In 1953, there was 3,000 adult members of this community in Yugoslavia and about 6,000 children. The Methodist community appeared in Vojvodina in the last decade of the 19th century. Formerly, the largest number of the adherents was of German ethnicity, while today members of the church are Slovaks, Serbs, Hungarians, Romani, etc.

Evangelical Church
The Evangelical Church in Serbia was founded in Novi Sad in 2006. It was formed from several organizational units of Evangelical Christianity. The first religious organizations from which this church originated existed in the territory of Vojvodina from 1900. Most of the adherents are situated in Vojvodina, mainly in Novi Sad, Žabalj and Stara Pazova. It belongs to the Pentecostal denomination.

Protestant Evangelical Church

The Protestant Evangelical Church Seat of this religious community is in Belgrade, Simina 8.

Christ Evangelical Church
The Christ Evangelical Church has been active in Serbia since 1950. Seat of this religious community is in Subotica, Ivana Zajca 17, mostly local churches are in Vojvodina: Subotica, Zrenjanin, Belgrade, Pančevo, Pivnice, Apatin, Senta, Ada, etc. The ethnic backgrounds of local churches are Serbian, Hungarian, Slovakian, and Gypsy. It belongs to the Assemblies of God denomination.

Church of God
The Church of God has been active in Serbia since 1968. Seat of this religious community was in Karanovci (in the Varvarin municipality, Rasina District), but since 2009, it is located in Sremska Mitrovica. It belongs to the Pentecostal denomination.

Free Church of Belgrade
The Free Church of Belgrade have its main seat in Zvezdara, Belgrade. It was founded in 1978 in Belgrade. It was founded by the former adherents of the Church of God.

Protestant Evangelical Church "Spiritual Center"
The Protestant Evangelical Church "Spiritual Center" have its seat in Leskovac. One part of the adherents of this church are some members of the Roma ethnic community from southern Serbia.

Church of Christ the Saviour
The Church of Christ the Saviour was founded recently and it is probably the youngest religious community in Novi Sad. It has about 120 members.

Church of Christ's Evangelical Brethren
The Church of Christ's Evangelical Brethren have seat in Belgrade. It has 20 members.

Slovak Evangelical Church of the Augsburg Confession in Serbia

The Slovak Evangelical Church of the Augsburg Confession in Serbia have its seat in Novi Sad. It is part of the World Lutheran Alliance which have its seat in Geneve. Most of the adherents of this church are ethnic Slovaks. Formerly, the seat of the bishopric was in Bački Petrovac. First Slovak Evangelics settled in Vojvodina in 1745. The church have about 50,000 adherents and it is divided into 4 seniorates: Bačka, Banat, Syrmia and special seniorates for faithful of German minority.

Church of Christ Brethren
The Church of Christ Brethren have its main seat in Bački Petrovac. It was founded in 1949 in Novi Sad, but it is active in Serbia since 1922. In 1999, it had 450 adherents in about 13 communities.

Spiritual Church of Christ

The Spiritual Church of Christ has seat in Padina. Besides church in Padina, there are 30 more churches of this community, including one in Novi Sad. The community is active in Serbia since 1950. It is a community of Pentecostal character. Former seats of the church were in Bački Petrovac, Vrdnik and Gložan. In 2002, there were 542 members of this church in Serbia, of which 230 in Padina.

Church of the Testament Sion
The Church of the Testament Sion have its main seat in Padina. It was founded in Padina in 2010. The community acting as an autonomous fraction of the Spiritual Church of Christ.

Evangelical Christian Church of the Augsburg Confession

The Evangelical Christian Church of the Augsburg Confession have its seat in Subotica. The church have about 10,000 adherents, mostly ethnic Hungarians from north Bačka. According to the Church constitution from 1955, this church is legal successor of the German Evangelical Christian Church of the Augsburg Confession from pre-war (i.e., pre-World War II) Yugoslavia in the territory of Serbia. In 1972, this church was included into the Slovak Evangelical Church of the Augsburg Confession and was organized as the Hungarian seniorate within that church. In 1998, the church again became independent. Until the end of the World War II, one number of the ethnic Germans of Vojvodina were adherents of this church.

Reformed Christian Church
The Reformed Christian Church in Serbia have its seat in Feketić. During one period, the seat of the church was in Pačir. Reformed Christian Church is official name for the Calvinism. Most of the adherents are ethnic Hungarians from Vojvodina. Church have about 20,000 members. The church was founded by the Reformates who came to Vojvodina from Kunhegyes and Tiszabura in 1785. Until the end of the World War II, one number of the ethnic Germans of Vojvodina were adherents of this church.

There are also the small Protestant Reformed Christian Church in Serbia, a separate denomination with 2 churches and missions.

Church of Jesus' Love
Church of Jesus' Love have its seat in Budapest, Hungary. Seat of this religious community in Serbia is in Senta. It was founded in Hungary and registered in 1998 in Budapest and it is active in Serbia since 2006.

See also
Religion in Serbia
Christianity in Serbia
Protestantism

References

Further reading
Branko Bjelajac, Protestantism u Srbiji, Beograd, 2003.
Bojan Aleksov, Nazareni među Srbima, Beograd, 2010.
Zorica Kuburić, Verske zajednice u Srbiji i verska distanca, Novi Sad, 2010.